Cinderella is a 2002 Russian-Ukrainian musical film produced by Melorama Production in association with Channel One (Russia) and Inter (Ukraine), under direction of Semen Horov in 2002.

Cast
 Yulia Mavrina as Cinderella 
 Nikolay Baskov as The Prince
 Valery Leontiev as The King
 Valery Meladze as Cinderella's Father
 Lolita Milyavskaya as Stepmother
 Andrey Danilko as Brunhilda - First Wicked Stepsister
 Inna Belokon (Yeryomenko) as Dafna - Second Wicked Stepsister
 Vladimir Goryansky as Court Astrologer
 Vitaly Linetsky as Court Doctor
 Larisa Dolina as Godmother
 Taisia Povaliy as Matchmaker
 Oleh Skrypka as Troubadour
 Olha Sumska as The Duchess
 Georgy Drozd as Major-domo
 Nu Virgos:
 Alena Vinnitskaya as Scandinavian Princess
 Nadia Meiher as Japanese Princess
 Anna Sedokova as English Princess
 Yevhen Paperny as Owl (voice)

Camera crew 

 Director: Semen Horov
 Screenwriter: Anton Fridlyand
 Producers: Aleksandr Faifman, Vladyslav Ryashin
 Cameraman: Alexey Stepanov
 Composer: Konstantin Meladze
 Artist: Mikhail Levchenko

References

External links

Cinderella

2002 films
Russian musical comedy films
Films based on Charles Perrault's Cinderella
Ukrainian comedy films
Russian television films
2000s musical comedy films
2002 comedy films